Justin Keith Warren (born April 10, 1985) is an American football a former arena football defensive lineman. He was signed on May 8, 2007 as an undrafted rookie free agent from Texas A&M University, but waived on May 15. In 2009, Warren played for the Spokane Shock professional arena football team.

Early life
Justin played football at Robert E. Lee High School in Tyler, Texas. In his senior year, he was named all-American in Parade magazine.

College career
Warren attended Texas A&M University and continued his football career there.

Professional career

Dallas Vigilantes
Warren advanced to the Arena Football 1 in 2010 with the Dallas Vigilantes.

Philadelphia Soul
Warren played with the Philadelphia Soul during the 2012 season.

San Jose SaberCats
In 2012, Warren signed with the San Jose SaberCats for the 2013 season.

Pittsburgh Power
On September 17, 2013, Warren was traded by the SaberCats to the Pittsburgh Power for future considerations.

References

External links
Patriots' Player Profile

Living people
1985 births
Sportspeople from Tyler, Texas
American football linebackers
Texas A&M Aggies football players
New England Patriots players
Virginia Destroyers players
Dallas Vigilantes players
Philadelphia Soul players
San Jose SaberCats players
Spokane Shock players
Players of American football from Texas